Allsvenskan (literally, "The All Swedish") is since the 2007–08 the second highest level of bandy in Sweden and comprises 24 teams in two regional groups. This change was made when Allsvenskan and Elitserien were cancelled and a new top-tier called Elitserien was created.

Structure
During the first two years, Allsvenskan consisted of three groups with ten teams in each, i.e. a total of 30 teams. The groups were divided geographically, in Allsvenskan Norra (North), Allsvenskan Mellersta (Mid) and Allsvenskan Södra (South).

For the third season, 2009–10, Allsvenskan was restructured into two groups, Norra and Södra, with 12 teams each, so there were only 24 teams left in total. This structure has so far (2014) been kept since then.

Teams

2017–18 teams

The following 16 teams took part in the 2017–18 season:
 Åby/Tjureda IF
 Falu BS
 Frillesås BK
 Gripen Trollhättan BK
 Gustavsbergs IF
 IF Boltic
 IFK Kungälv
 Lidköpings AIK
 Ljusdals BK
 Nässjö IF
 NitroNora BS
 Örebro SK
 Peace & Love City Bandy
 Tranås BoIS
 UNIK Bandy
 Västanfors IF

Former teams
Due to many promotions to Elitserien and relegations to Division 1, there have been many clubs playing in Allsvenskan through the years. They are all in the following list with information about the seasons they played in Allsvenskan.

  means the club was promoted to Elitserien for the following season
  means the club was relegated to Division 1 for the following season
  means the club had qualified for Allsvenskan but choose to withdraw.

Notes

See also
Allsvenskan and Elitserien

References

External links
 Official website

Bandy leagues in Sweden
National bandy leagues
Professional sports leagues in Sweden